Fantastic Plastic may refer to:

 Fantastic Plastic Records, an independent record label
 Fantastic Plastic (album), a 2017 album by The Flamin' Groovies
 Fantastic Plastics (band), a two piece, Neo-New Wave band based in New York City